Bellewaerde is a theme park in the West Flemish countryside at Zonnebeke near Ypres, Belgium (it is physically located just inside the Ypres municipality boundary). It was established in 1954, on the grounds of the World War I Battle of Bellewaarde. Named after an old castle in its territory that still stands near the main entrance, Bellewaerde is the oldest operating theme park in Belgium. Originally a zoo and safari, the park expanded in the early eighties to become more of a general theme- and thrillpark, catering towards teens and families. The  park is known for its beautiful gardens, marvelous landscaping and its attention to theming. Its mascotte is a lion dressed as a king, King Lion. Bellewaerde draws about 850,000 - 900,000 visitors a year and is the main theme park in Flanders.

Major rides include the first Boomerang coaster in Europe (1984), a duelling alpine coaster (Dawson Duel), a Vekoma Mad House (Houdini's Magical House), several water rides including a log flume, a river rapids ride and a spillwater ride, the Screaming Eagle vertical drop tower, various stock rides such as a pirate ship, a swing carousel, an original Zierer beetle coaster, old-timers, carousels, an octopus, tea-cups and a Jungle Cruise-like boat ride, and an entertainment schedule that changes every year. Bellewaerde's additions since 2000 are the world's first Topple Tower from Huss, El Volador (2005), a Zierer indoor coaster, Huracan (2013) a duelling alpine coaster, Dawson Duel (2017), and a Gerstlauer family coaster, Wakala (2020). In June 2019, the park opened the 3000m² Bellewaerde Aquapark, which features a variety of slides, pools, and a lazy river.

History 
On 3 July 1954, the Touristic Centre of Bellewaerde was founded in Zillebeke. It was opened originally as a zoo and safaripark by the Florizoone family, which also operated Meli Park in Adinkerke. In 1971, the name was changed to "Bellewaerde Park', and simplified to "Bellewaerde" in 2004. In the 1980s, the park evolved to an attraction park with rides such as the River Splash (a log flume, 1980) and the Keverbaan (a beetle coaster, 1981). In 1981, 1984 and 1985 the park was expanded with the addition of the "Far West", "Canada" and "Mexico" zones, respectively.

Bellewaerde was sold in the early 1990s to the Walibi group which in itself became part of the Six Flags Chain in 1998. Six Flags sold all of its European parks, including Bellewaerde, in 2004 to the British investment company Palamon. Bellewaerde is now part of the Grévin & Cie group, which is fully owned by Compagnie des Alpes.

In 2008, Bellewaerde officially became a zoo and a savannah-themed area was opened.

Bellewaerde is a seasonal theme park that is open for about seven months a year, from April until October. October is traditionally the month in which Bellewaerde's yearly Halloween Event takes place. Since 2005, the park also opens in the winter for few weeks during the Christmas and New Year period, decorated for the holidays with extra Christmas attractions and special entertainment.

Rides & Attractions

Current attractions and rides

Removed attractions and rides

Animals

Current animals

Removed animals

See also 
 Walibi Belgium
 Walibi Holland
 Walibi Rhône-Alpes
 Walibi Lorraine
 Walibi Aquitaine

Gallery

References

External links



Animal theme parks
Amusement parks in Belgium
Tourist attractions in West Flanders
Buildings and structures in Ypres
Former Six Flags theme parks
Compagnie des Alpes
Zoos in Belgium
1954 establishments in Belgium
Amusement parks opened in 1954